The Former Amsterdam Main Post Office, now the shopping centre Magna Plaza, is a monumental building located at Nieuwezijds Voorburgwal 182, Amsterdam, Netherlands. It was built in 1895–1899 in Neo-Gothic and Neo-Renaissance style. The building has been a rijksmonument (Dutch national monument) since July 9, 1974, and is part of the Top 100 Dutch heritage sites.

Construction 

Exterior 
The exterior is heavily decorated with polychromatic brick with details in dressed stone, including framing for all windows and doors. Across the roof edges are a large number of dormers, each with their own crow-stepped gable. Due to the pear shaped crowns on top of the towers the building is colloquially named ‘Perenburg’ (English: pearburg).

Interior 
The building's interior consists of a central hall with galleries on two upper floors, surrounded by arcades and crowned by a sunroof. The public function of the building was limited to the ground floor, while the rest of the building was only accessible to personnel of the PTT, then the national post, telegraph and telephone agency. In 1987, the PTT announced that it intended to vacate the building and it was sold the next year for 7.5 million guilders (about 3.2 million euro) to Larmag, a Swedish real estate developer, who intended to repurpose the building as a luxury shopping centre. Maintaining and optimally using the monumental building was a main criterion. The construction started in February 1991. The exterior work was mostly limited to cleaning, repair and restoration of the facades. The interior of the building was completely rebuilt, maintaining the carrying structures and decorative elements.

Renovation and shopping mall 
Unexpected technical problems delayed the work; the building's foundation had to be replaced, and several of the beams were found to be hollow. The floors of the new mall were connected by escalators and elevators. The existing stairways were maintained, two as emergency stairways, and one as a public stairway. Office spaces were created in the attic. The renovation was led by H. Ruijssenaars. The Magna Plaza shopping centre, named after Larmag's CEO Lars-Erik Magnusson, was finally opened to the public on August 17, 1992.

In 2016, DPM Group sold Magna Plaza to institutional investors from Europe and Israel with a rumoured purchase price of around 63.5 million euro.

Historical images

References 

Rijksmonuments in Amsterdam
Former post office buildings
Shopping malls in the Netherlands